Quinuacocha (possibly from Quechua kinwa quinoa, qucha lake, "quinoa lake") is a lake in Peru located in the Ancash Region, Pallasca Province, Conchucos District. Quinuacocha lies northeast of a group of lakes named Pusaccocha (Quechua for "five lakes").

References 

Lakes of Peru
Lakes of Ancash Region